Phacochoerus is a genus in the family Suidae, commonly known as warthogs (pronounced wart-hog). They are pigs who live in open and semi-open habitats, even in quite arid regions, in sub-Saharan Africa. The two species were formerly considered conspecific under the scientific name Phacochoerus aethiopicus, but today this is limited to the desert warthog, while the best-known and most widespread species, the common warthog (or simply warthog), is Phacochoerus africanus.

Although covered in bristly hairs, their bodies and heads appear largely naked from a distance, with only the crest along the back, and the tufts on their cheeks and tails being obviously haired. The English name refers to their facial wattles, which are particularly distinct in males. They are largely herbivorous, but occasionally also eat small animals. While both species remain fairly common and widespread, and therefore are considered to be of Least Concern by the IUCN, the nominate subspecies of the desert warthog, commonly known as the Cape warthog, became extinct around 1865.

Species in taxonomic order

The genus Phacochoerus contains two species. The two species emerged from ecological barriers. P. africanus were found with a lack of upper incisors, while P. aethiopicus were found with a full set.

References

External links

 d'Huart, J.P. & Grubb, P. (2005). A photographic guide to the differences between the Common Warthog (Phacochoerus africanus) and the Desert Warthog (Ph. aethiopicus). Suiform Soundings 5(2): 4–8.

 
Fauna of Sub-Saharan Africa 
 
Taxa named by Frédéric Cuvier
Taxonomy articles created by Polbot